Diiron nonacarbonyl is an organometallic compound with the formula Fe2(CO)9.  This metal carbonyl is an important reagent in organometallic chemistry and of occasional use in organic synthesis.  It is a more reactive source of Fe(0) than Fe(CO)5.  This micaceous orange solid is virtually insoluble in all common solvents.

Synthesis and structure
Following the original method, photolysis of an acetic acid solution of Fe(CO)5 produces Fe2(CO)9 in good yield:
2 Fe(CO)5 →  Fe2(CO)9 + CO

Fe2(CO)9 consists of a pair of Fe(CO)3 centers linked by three bridging CO ligands.  Although older textbooks show an Fe-Fe bond consistent with the 18 electron rule (8 valence electrons from Fe, two each from the terminal carbonyls, one each from the bridging carbonyls and one from the other Fe atom in the metal-metal bond), theoretical analyses have consistently indicated the absence of a direct Fe-Fe bond: this latter model proposes an Fe-C-Fe three-center-two-electron "banana bond" for one of the bridging carbonyls. The minor isomer has been crystallized together with C60. The iron atoms are equivalent and octahedral molecular geometry.  Elucidation of the structure of Fe2(CO)9 proved to be challenging because its low solubility inhibits growth of crystals. The Mößbauer spectrum reveals one quadrupole doublet, consistent with the D3h-symmetric structure.

Reactions
Fe2(CO)9 is a precursor to compounds of the type Fe(CO)4L and Fe(CO)3(diene).  Such syntheses are typically conducted in THF solution.  In these conversions, it is proposed that small amounts of Fe2(CO)9 dissolve according to the following reaction:
Fe2(CO)9  →  Fe(CO)5  +  Fe(CO)4(THF)

Oxidative addition of allyl bromide to diiron nonacarbonyl gives the allyl iron(II) derivaive:
Fe2(CO)9  +  BrCH2CH=CH2  →  FeBr(CO)3(C3H5) + CO  +  Fe(CO)5

Cyclobutadieneiron tricarbonyl is prepared similarly using 3,4-dichlorocyclobutene: 
C4H4Cl2 + 2 Fe2(CO)9 → (C4H4)Fe(CO)3 + 2 Fe(CO)5 + 2 CO + 2 FeCl2.  

Fe2(CO)9 has also been employed in the synthesis of cyclopentadienones via a net [2+3]-cycloaddition from dibromoketones, known as the Noyori [3+2] reaction.

Low temperature UV/vis photolysis of Fe2(CO)9 yields the Fe2(CO)8 unsaturated complex, producing both CO-bridged and unbridged isomers.

Safety
Metal carbonyls are typically treated as if they are highly toxic.

References

Carbonyl complexes
Iron complexes
Organoiron compounds
Iron(0) compounds